
Year 350 (CCCL) was a common year starting on Monday (link will display the full calendar) of the Julian calendar. At the time, it was known as the Year of the Consulship of Sergius and Nigrinianus (or, less frequently, year 1103 Ab urbe condita). The denomination 350 for this year has been used since the early medieval period, when the Anno Domini calendar era became the prevalent method in Europe for naming years.

Events 
 By place 
 Roman Empire 
 January 18 – Western Roman Emperor Constans I makes himself extremely unpopular; one of his generals, Magnentius, is proclaimed emperor at Augustodunum in the Diocese of Galliae, with the support of the army on the Rhine frontier.
 January – Constans I flees towards Spain, where he is subsequently assassinated at Castrum Helenae. Magnentius rules the Western Roman Empire and is far more tolerant towards Christians and Pagans alike. 
 March 1 – Vetranio is asked by Constantina, sister of Constantius II, to proclaim himself Caesar. Constantius accepts the new emperor and sends him funds to raise an army.
 June 3 – Nepotianus, Roman usurper, proclaims himself emperor and enters Rome with a group of gladiators.
 June 30 – Nepotianus is defeated and killed by Marcellinus, a trusted general sent by Magnentius. His head is put on a spear and carried around the city. 
 December 25 – Vetranio meets Constantius II at Naissus (Serbia) and joins  forces with him. Vetranio is forced to abdicate his title, and Constantius allows him to live as a private citizen on a state pension.

 Asia 
 King Pushyavarman establishes the Varman Dynasty in Assam. 
 About this time the Huns begin to invade the Sassanid Empire.
 The city of Anbar (Iraq) is founded by king Shapur II.
 The Wei-Jie war breaks out in North China.

 By topic 
 Art 
 The church of Santa Constanza in Rome is finished.

Births 
 Honoratus, archbishop of Arles (approximate date);
 Hypatia of Alexandria, female Neoplatonist philosopher (approximate date);
 Murong Wei, emperor of the Xianbei state Former Yan (d. 385);
 Plutarch of Athens, Greek philosopher (approximate date);
 Theodore of Mopsuestia, bishop and theologian (approximate date);
 Zhang Xuanjing, ruler of the Chinese state Former Liang (d. 363).

Deaths 

 February 11 – Constans I, Roman Emperor;
 June 21 – Martin of Tongres, Roman Catholic bishop and saint;
 June 30 – Nepotianus, Roman usurper;
 August 5 – Cassian of Autun Roman Catholic bishop and saint;
 November 26 – Paul I of Constantinople, Byzantine Orthodox bishop and saint.

Date unknown 
 Shi Jian, emperor of the Jie state Later Zhao.

References